WJBK can refer to:
 Wei Ji Bai Ke, Chinese name of Wikipedia.
 WJBK, a Fox-affiliated television station in Detroit, Michigan
 WLQV, an AM radio station in Detroit, Michigan, previously known as WJBK
 WDRQ, an FM radio station in Detroit, Michigan, previously as WJBK-FM